Hobart Historic Cruises operates cruises and charters on the Derwent River, Tasmania. These historic ferry tours have operated on the Derwent Harbour since the 1980s .

Ferry routes
The longer ferry route travels North and South of the Tasman Bridge. The other two go North and South, respectively.

Bus tours
Bus tours visit Port Arthur, Bruny Island , Richmond, Mt Wellington and Devil Zoo.

History
Captain Fell's Historic Ferries had a long history of operating ferries on the Derwent River. The owner of the Spirit of Hobart was Peter O'May, a descendant of the original O'May Family that have been operating ferries on the Derwent River since 1863.

The business ownership was transferred from Peter O'May to the LJ Family Trust in September 2013. During this time, the business began to encounter controversy after a series of workplace incidents and poor public perception

Ferries

References 

Companies based in Hobart
Tourist attractions in Tasmania
Travel and holiday companies of Australia
Tourism in Hobart
Ferry companies of Tasmania